SeeYouSpaceCowboy (formerly stylized as SeeYouSpaceCowboy...) is an American hardcore punk band formed in San Diego, California, in 2016. It was founded by vocalist Connie Sgarbossa, Ethan Sgarbossa and Taylor Allen. Their name is taken from a phrase shown on many of the end title cards of the 1998 anime Cowboy Bebop.

History
Before the formation of SeeYouSpaceCowboy, vocalist Connie Sgarbossa and her younger brother Ethan Sgarbossa both played in the bands Flowers Taped to Pens and René Descartes. Ethan originally played guitar for both groups before switching to drums for SeeYouSpaceCowboy. Taylor Allen and Jesse Price played together in a hardcore band called Recluse before the formation of their next project, Letters to Catalonia, which features Jesse on vocals and guitar, and fellow former SeeYouSpaceCowboy member, Dominic Larocca, on bass. SeeYouSpaceCowboy formed in 2016, before Connie relocated to Oakland.

The original lineup, and that which appears on the demo, consisted of only four members; Price playing bass and Allen playing guitar. Timmy Moreno was soon added as a bassist, and Price went on to be a guitarist.

In a 2018 interview with Revolver the band revealed that they had plans to release a debut full-length album sometime in 2019, the group were in the writing stage as of when the interview was taken place in August. Connie Sgarbossa hinted of what is to come: "There's going to be sassing, there's going to be breakdowns … there's going to be weird, screechy shit."

As of January 25, 2019 it was revealed the band had signed to Pure Noise Records, speaking about their new partnership with Pure Noise Records, the band said: “We are beyond happy to be part of the Pure Noise family. After a summer of searching, we decided to go with Pure Noise because of the diverse and innovative roster, a showcase for some of the most exciting bands in the scene. We are very eager to show the world the next chapter of this band, with this great team behind us.“ Alongside the announcement the band digitally released the album Songs for the Firing Squad, which the band describes as "a collection of the first two years as a band, along with two new tracks that foreshadow the new direction we are headed." The band also released an accompanying music video for the song “Self Help Specialist Ends Own Life”

On July 30, 2019 they released a brand new track, "Armed with Their Teeth" and announced the title for their debut full length record, The Correlation Between Entrance and Exit Wounds. On August 27, 2019 they released another single, "Put On A Show, Don't Let Them See You Fall". The record was released on September 27, 2019 and met with immediately favorable reviews. Loudwire named it one of the 50 best metal albums of 2019.

On November 5, 2021 the band dropped their second studio album, The Romance of Affliction. It was elected by Loudwire as the 36th best rock/metal album of 2021.

On July 19, 2022, the band released a music video for their cover of the Saosin song "Seven Years". The song is featured on the Pure Noise compilation Dead Formats: Volume 1.

Politics
SeeYouSpaceCowboy looks to create a dialogue with fans regarding LGBTQ representation, their personal politics also include vegan, anti-racist and anti-capitalist messages. Sgarbossa notes that the quintet hope to bring a zine library on future tours to help spread awareness of their intersectional beliefs.

Musical style
SeeYouSpaceCowboy's musical style has been characterized as sasscore, metalcore, mathcore, hardcore punk and art-punk.

The band chooses to self-describe as sasscore and often disagrees with the label "screamo"; lead singer Connie Sgarbossa states, "Everybody in this band came from the screamo scene, and we'd been doing it for a minute, but with this band we really wanted to make the distinction that this isn't a screamo band." Songs for the Firing Squad features a song titled "Stop Calling Us Screamo", which Connie Sgarbossa later clarified as " our tongue-in-cheek jab at the people that want to throw us into that scene."

Band members
Current members
 Connie Sgarbossa – lead vocals (2016–present)
 Ethan Sgarbossa – drums (2016–2019), guitar, clean vocals (2019–present) 
 Taylor Allen – guitar (2016–2017), bass, clean vocals (2020–present) 
 Timmy Moreno – bass (2016–2018), guitar (2021–present)  
 AJ Tartol - drums (2021–present), backing vocals (2021–present)

Past members
 Jesse Price – bass (2016), guitar, backing vocals (2016–2020)
 Cameron Phipps – bass (2019–2020)
 Dominick Larocca – guitar (2017–2018)
 Liam Coombe – guitar, bass (2018–2019)
 Andrew Milam – bass (2018–2019)
 Tim Austin - guitar (2020)
 Bryan Prosser – drums (2019)
 Sal Argento - drums (2019–2021)

Timeline

Discography

Studio albums

Compilation albums

Extended plays

Singles

Music videos

References

Musical groups established in 2016
Musical groups from Los Angeles
Punk rock groups from California
LGBT-themed musical groups
2016 establishments in California
Metalcore musical groups from California
American mathcore musical groups